Saeid Ahani (born 9 February 2001) is an Iranian footballer who plays as a defender who currently plays for Iranian club Pars Jonoubi Jam in the Persian Gulf Pro League.

Club career

Pars Jonoubi Jam
He made his debut for Pars Jonoubi Jam in 16th fixtures of 2018–19 Iran Pro League against Foolad.

Honours

International 
Iran U16
 AFC U-16 Championship runner-up: 2016

References

2001 births
Living people
People from Mashhad
Iranian footballers
Pars Jonoubi Jam players
Association football defenders
Naft Masjed Soleyman F.C. players